Bahrain competed at the 2009 Asian Youth Games held in Singapore from June 29, 2009 to July 7, 2009. Bahrain sent 22 athletes who competed in 8 sports and finished with 1 bronze medal.

Medal tally

By sport

Athletics

Bahrain joined the athletics competition at the 2009 Asian Youth Games. As a matter of fact, Bahrain sent the most number of athletes in this sport. The country won one bronze medal in the boys' 4 × 200 m relay event.

Boys

Girls

Basketball

Bahrain joined the girls' division of basketball competition at the 2009 Asian Youth Games. It was joined in Group C with China, India and Singapore. The team was not able to proceed in the next round because it lost all its games in the preliminary round.

Preliminary round results

Preliminary round rank

Beach volleyball

Bahrain joined the boys' division of the beach volleyball competition at the 2009 Asian Youth Games. The country sent Mohamed Hammad and Ali Sultan as its representatives. In the preliminary round, Bahrain was joined in Group C with Chinese Taipei, Qatar and Thailand. The pair won one game in its three-games series. It won over Qatar but lost to Chinese Taipei and Thailand. The pair advanced to the quarterfinal round where they battled against the Indonesian pair but lost in two straight sets thus losing hopes of advancing to the next round.

Preliminary round results

Preliminary round rank

|}

Bowling

Bahrain joined the bowling competition at the 2009 Asian Youth Games. The country sent four athletes who were all male. They all joined the individual, doubles and team competition of the sport but failed to win a medal in any division.

Individual/Singles

The bowling boys' singles competition at the 2009 Asian Youth Games was held on July 1.

Doubles

The bowling boys' doubles competition at the 2009 Asian Youth Games was held on July 2.

Team

The bowling boys' team competition at the 2009 Asian Youth Games was held from July 3 to 4.

Sailing

Bahrain also joined the sailing competition at the 2009 Asian Youth Games. It sent one male athlete. He was Faisal Abdulla. Abdulla joined the Boys' Byte CII competition. He placed sixth in that competition with a total score of 63.

2009 in Bahraini sport
Sport in Bahrain
Nations at the 2009 Asian Youth Games
Bahrain at the Asian Games